is a former Japanese football player. He played for Japan national team.

Club career
Hayashi was born in Machida on August 29, 1972. After graduating from Komazawa University, he joined Verdy Kawasaki (later Tokyo Verdy) in 1995. Although he played as regular player in first season, his opportunity to play decreased from 1996. In 1998, he moved to Vissel Kobe on loan. In 1999, he returned to Verdy Kawasaki and he became a regular player. The club won 2004 Emperor's Cup. However the club was relegated to J2 League in 2005. He moved to Ventforet Kofu. He retired at the end of the 2009 season.

National team career
On August 6, 1995, Hayashi debuted for Japan national team against Costa Rica. On August 9, he also played against Brazil. He played 2 games for Japan in 1995.

Coaching career
After the retirement, Hayashi signed with Vissel Kobe in 2018. He served as an assistant coach under manager Takayuki Yoshida in April. In September, manager Yoshida resigned for poor results. Hayashi managed 2 matches until Vissel signed with new manager Juan Manuel Lillo. In June 2019, Hayashi resigned with Vissel.

Club statistics

National team statistics

Managerial statistics

References

External links
 
 Japan National Football Team Database
 
 

1972 births
Living people
Komazawa University alumni
Association football people from Tokyo
Japanese footballers
Japan international footballers
J1 League players
J2 League players
Tokyo Verdy players
Vissel Kobe players
Ventforet Kofu players
Japanese football managers
J1 League managers
Vissel Kobe managers
Association football midfielders